The Church of the Holy Comforter, built in 1860, is a Gothic Revival church located at 18 Davies Place, near the train station in Poughkeepsie, New York, United States, a few blocks from the Hudson River. Its steeples are prominently visible to traffic passing through the city since the construction of the elevated US 9 expressway in 1965.

The congregation first formed in 1854 as Christ Church. Six years later, it had incorporated and hired Richard Upjohn, a prominent architect noted for his churches, to design a building. His original plans are on file at Columbia University's Avery Library. The cornerstone - located at the southwest buttress of the tower was laid on June 14, 1859 and the church was consecrated by Bishop Horatio Potter on October 25, 1860. Holy Comforter is a cruciform church with walls of local Ulster County bluestone - from across the river and trim of New Jersey Brownstone. Inside, the original pews are still in place (note - the original church was "free" which meant that it did not have pews - as it was customary at the time to charge a fee for pews and this church was meant for the working people and poor of this area) and the vaulted ceiling is supported with Carpenter Gothic-style wooden ribs.

It is now known as the Church of the Holy Comforter in the Archdiocese of New York of the Holy Orthodox Catholic and Apostolic Church of America and is no longer affiliated with the Episcopal Church. Its break with the Episcopal Church grows out of disagreements and events in the 1970s.

On April 13, 1972, it was added to the National Register of Historic Places. It is also a contributing property to the Mill Street-North Clover Street Historic District listed on the Register later that year.

See also
 National Register of Historic Places listings in Poughkeepsie, New York

References

External links
Parish of the Holy Comforter website
Holy Catholic Church Anglican Rite website
National Register listing
Pictures of church interior

Churches on the National Register of Historic Places in New York (state)
Gothic Revival church buildings in New York (state)
Churches completed in 1860
Religious organizations established in 1854
Episcopal church buildings in New York (state)
U.S. Route 9
Richard Upjohn church buildings
19th-century Episcopal church buildings
National Register of Historic Places in Poughkeepsie, New York
Churches in Poughkeepsie, New York
1854 establishments in New York (state)